 
Orange County Fire may refer to:

 Orange County wildfire - A wildfire that occurred in Orange County, California during October 2007.
 Orange County Fire Authority - The fire department for Orange County, California. 
 Orange County Fire Rescue - The fire department for Orange County, Florida.